Swiss Nights Vol. 2 is a live album led by saxophonist Dexter Gordon recorded in Zurich in 1975 and released on the Danish SteepleChase label in 1978.

Reception

In his review for AllMusic, Scott Yanow said "The second of three CDs taken from Gordon's appearances at the 1975 Montreux Jazz Festival showcases the veteran tenor in peak form. With strong support from the talented rhythm section ...Dexter Gordon is heard throughout at his best".

Track listing
 "There Is No Greater Love" (Isham Jones, Marty Symes) - 15:08
 "Sticky Wicket" (Dexter Gordon) - 5:33
 "Wave" (Antônio Carlos Jobim) - 10:59 Bonus track on CD reissue 		
 "Rhythm-a-Ning/The Theme" (Thelonious Monk/Traditional) - 11:41 Bonus track on CD reissue
 "Darn That Dream" (Eddie DeLange, Jimmy Van Heusen) - 9:47
 "Montmartre/The Theme" (Dexter Gordon/Traditional) - 9:36

Personnel
Dexter Gordon - tenor saxophone
Kenny Drew - piano
Niels-Henning Ørsted Pedersen - bass 
Alex Riel - drums

References

1978 live albums
Dexter Gordon live albums
SteepleChase Records live albums